Cook's Bridge is a Grade II listed bridge crossing the River Alyn near Trevalyn, Rossett in Wrexham County Borough, Wales. It is located to the south-east of Cooksbridge Farm, and roughly a third of a mile or half a kilometre from Rossett Road (B5102).

The bridge dates to the early 19th century and contains a single-span of ashlar stone. The segmental arch has voussoirs and a keystone projecting into string course. The bridge's parapets are swept widely either end to allow for waiting traffic, as the bridge is a single-laned bridge.

A long-distance waymarked footpath lies to its immediate north along the river. The bridge is listed by Cadw.

See also 
 List of bridges in Wales

References 

Road bridges in Wales
Bridges in Wrexham County Borough
Grade II listed bridges in Wales
Grade II listed buildings in Wrexham County Borough